Mobaceras is an extinct genus of biarmosuchian therapsids in the family Burnetiidae from the Guadalupian of Zambia. The type species is M. zambeziense.

References 

Burnetiamorphs
Prehistoric therapsid genera
Guadalupian synapsids of Africa
Fossils of Zambia
Fossil taxa described in 2021
Taxa named by Christian F. Kammerer
Taxa named by Christian Sidor